The Narva Hydroelectric Station is a hydroelectric power station in Ivangorod, Russia. It was designed by a Leningrad design bureau Lenhydroproject and constructed during 1950–1955.

After the dissolution of the Soviet Union the Estonia–Russia border bisects the dam of the reservoir. The power station itself is entirely on Russian territory. The power station is owned and operated by TGC-1 power company.  The dam is owned by TGC-1 and Narva Power Plants.

See also

References

Hydroelectric power stations built in the Soviet Union
Hydroelectric power stations in Russia
Dams in Russia
Dams in Estonia
Buildings and structures in Leningrad Oblast
TGC-1
Dams completed in 1955
1955 establishments in Estonia
1955 establishments in Russia
1955 establishments in the Soviet Union
Hydroelectric power stations in Estonia